Rip Van is an American food company that currently manufactures stroopwafels (Rip Van Wafels),keto wafers (Rip Van Wafers), Keto cookies, Keto candy, Keto gummies and other keto snacks in the United States. The company manufactured two thin waffle pastries melded together with a sweet syrup center, aka a syrup waffle.

History 
The company was started by two college students at Brown University, Amsterdam-native Rip Pruisken and Marco De Leon, in 2010 from their dorm room. The two used Kickstarter to launch their business, calling their product Van Wafels. The two founders slept in a Volvo station wagon as they drove across the country to deliver their product to stores. They spent two years on campus trying to improve product marketing and the quality of the snack.

The name of the product was inspired by the Washington Irving story Rip Van Winkle. In 2016, the company's founders were included in the 2016 edition of Forbes 30 Under 30 . In November 2020, the product was listed as one of the fastest-growing brands on Amazon within the grocery category.

References 

Food manufacturers of the United States
Manufacturing companies based in San Francisco
Waffles
2010 establishments in Rhode Island
American companies established in 2010